Arthur Daniel Miller (born December 24, 1944) is a Canadian politician. He served as interim leader of the New Democratic Party of British Columbia and as the 32nd premier of British Columbia for six months from August 25, 1999 to February 24, 2000, following the resignation of Glen Clark.

Life and career
Born in Port Alice, British Columbia, Miller worked as a millwright and a councillor for the city of Prince Rupert. He was first elected to the BC legislature in the 1986 election, representing the riding of Prince Rupert, and served as the BC NDP's forestry critic while that party was in opposition.

He was re-elected to the BC legislature in the 1991 election, representing the new riding of North Coast. With the NDP coming into power, he was appointed minister of forests in the cabinet of Premier Mike Harcourt in November 1991, then served as the Minister of Skills, Training and Labour from September 1993. He was named deputy premier in February 1996 after Glen Clark replaced Harcourt as premier and NDP leader.

After winning re-election in 1996, he continued in his role as deputy premier under Clark until 1999, and variously served as Minister of Municipal Affairs (June 1996–January 1997), Minister of Employment and Investment (January 1997–February 1998) and Minister of Energy and Mines and Minister Responsible for Northern Development (1998–2000).

An uncontroversial and moderate politician, Miller was elected interim leader of the BC NDP by an emergency meeting of the provincial caucus following the sudden resignation of Premier Clark on August 21, 1999. He was sworn in as premier on August 25, and continued in his roles of Minister of Energy and Mines and Minister Responsible for Northern Development. During his brief premiership, Miller's chief of staff was John Horgan, who would become premier in 2017. He was replaced as premier when Ujjal Dosanjh became party leader in February 2000, and he did not run for re-election in the 2001 election.

In 2003, Miller supported Bill Blaikie's bid to become leader of the federal New Democratic Party.

In early 2005, Miller was hired by the BC Government as an advisor for the province's offshore oil and gas development team, and has also worked for a major pipeline company and a forest company since leaving office.

References

1944 births
20th-century Canadian politicians
British Columbia municipal councillors
Deputy premiers of British Columbia
Leaders of the British Columbia CCF/NDP
Living people
Members of the Executive Council of British Columbia
People from the Regional District of Mount Waddington
Premiers of British Columbia